Lucien Guiguet (born 26 September 1942) is a French former modern pentathlete. He competed at the 1968 Summer Olympics winning a bronze medal in the team event.

References

1942 births
Living people
French male modern pentathletes
Olympic modern pentathletes of France
Modern pentathletes at the 1968 Summer Olympics
Olympic bronze medalists for France
Olympic medalists in modern pentathlon
Medalists at the 1968 Summer Olympics